H. inornatus may refer to:
 Heleioporus inornatus, a frog species endemic to Australia
 Hemitriccus inornatus, a bird species
 Hydrophis inornatus, a sea snake species
 Hyperolius inornatus, a frog species endemic to the Democratic Republic of the Congo

See also
 Inornatus